John Brookes is an English retired football forward who played in both the North American Soccer League.

In 1968, he played for the Cleveland Stokers in the North American Soccer League. He spent the 1970–1971 season with Stockport County before transferring to Matlock Town. He played for Matlock Town through at least the 1975–1976 season.

References

External links
 NASL stats

1945 births
Cleveland Stokers players
English footballers
English expatriate footballers
Matlock Town F.C. players
North American Soccer League (1968–1984) players
Southport F.C. players
Stockport County F.C. players
York City F.C. players
Living people
Association football forwards
English expatriate sportspeople in the United States
Expatriate soccer players in the United States